The men's ISSF 25 meter rapid fire pistol was one of the thirteen shooting events at the 1992 Summer Olympics. It was the first Olympic rapid fire competition on the new, circular targets, and also the only one in history to feature both a semifinal, consisting of four four-second series for the top eight shooters, and a final, consisting of two additional four-second series for the top four. Afanasijs Kuzmins (for the first time competing for independent Latvia) and Ralf Schumann, who had battled for the gold medal four years earlier, once again clinched the top two spots, although in reversed order. The two were the eighth and ninth men to win multiple medals in the event. Schumann's win was the first victory (and first medal) for unified Germany since 1936, though East Germany (including Schumann himself) had won medals since. Kuzmins earned Latvia's first independent medal (the country had competed in 1936 before being incorporated into the Soviet Union). Vladimir Vokhmyanin of the Unified Team finished on the same score as Kuzmins, but a lower final score demoted him to bronze. There were 30 competitors from 23 nations. Nations had been limited to two shooters each since the 1952 Games.

Background

This was the 19th appearance of what had been standardised in 1948 as the men's ISSF 25 meter rapid fire pistol event, the only event on the 2020 programme that traces back to 1896. The event has been held at every Summer Olympics except 1904 and 1928 (when no shooting events were held) and 1908; it was open to women from 1968 to 1980. The first five events were quite different, with some level of consistency finally beginning with the 1932 event—which, though it had differences from the 1924 competition, was roughly similar. The 1936 competition followed the 1932 one quite closely. The post-World War II event substantially altered the competition once again. The 1984 Games introduced women's-only shooting events, including the ISSF 25 meter pistol (though this is more similar to the non-Olympic men's ISSF 25 meter center-fire pistol than the rapid fire pistol).

Five of the eight finalists from 1988 returned: gold medalist (and 1980 top-10 finisher) Afanasijs Kuzmins of the Soviet Union (now competing for Latvia), silver medalist Ralf Schumann of East Germany (now competing for unified Germany), fifth-place finisher Adam Kaczmarek of Poland, sixth-place finisher Bernardo Tobar of Colombia, and seventh-place finisher John McNally of the United States.  Schumann was the reigning (1990) world champion; Miroslav Ignatiuk of the Unified Team had finished second and Petri Eteläniemi of Finland third.

Albania made its debut in the event; some former Soviet republics competed as the Unified Team. The United States made its 16th appearance, most of any nation.

Competition format

The competition format used a three-round tournament for the only time, using a qualifying round, semifinal, and a final.

The qualifying round from 1988 onward was essentially the same as the full competition format from 1948–1984. Each shooter fired 60 shots. These were done in two courses of 30; each course consisted of two stages of 15; each stage consisted of three series of 5. In each stage, the time limit for each series was 8 seconds for the first, 6 seconds for the second, and 4 seconds for the third. 

The 1988 tournament had added a two-series final for the top eight shooters; the 1992 competition broke that down to a four-series semifinal for the top eight and two-series final for the top four. 

Eight shooters advanced to the semifinal. There, they shot four series of 5 shots each, all at 4 seconds. The semifinal score was added to the qualifying round score to give the semifinal total. The top four shooters by semifinal total advanced again to the final. There, they shot two more series of 5 shots each, again at 4 seconds, adding that score to their qualifying and semifinal rounds to give a final total. The finalists fired a total of 90 shots across the three rounds, with a maximum score of 900.

The 1992 competition introduced round targets rather than the silhouettes used from 1948 to 1988 as well as many pre-World War II versions of the event. Score, rather than hits, had been used as the primary ranking method since 1960.

Records

The Official Report lists Schumann's 594 in the qualifying round as a new Olympic record, suggesting that the 598 shot by Kuzmins in 1988 was considered a different format (after the change in targets from silhouettes to round targets). The 70-shot qualifying plus final used in 1988 was not used in 1992; the 80-shot qualifying plus final and 90-shot three-round score used in 1992 were not used again.

Schedule

Results

Qualifying

Semifinal

Final

Kuzmins prevailed over Vokhmyanin due to the final scores tie-breaker (97 to 96).

References

Sources

Shooting at the 1992 Summer Olympics
Men's 1992
Men's events at the 1992 Summer Olympics